Seiken Sugiura (杉浦 正健 Sugiura Seiken, born July 26, 1934) is a Japanese politician and lawyer. He was named Minister of Justice on October 31, 2005 and served in the cabinet of Prime Minister Junichiro Koizumi. Being a Buddhist, he imposed a moratorium on executions during his time as Minister of Justice.

He was defeated in the 2009 election by Yasuhiro Nakane, a member of the Democratic Party of Japan. He has remained engaged in discussions over the death penalty in Japan since leaving politics. On October 3, 2015, he spoke at a World Day against the Death Penalty event in Tokyo, along with Hideo Hiraoka, who was justice minister under the Democratic Party of Japan.

References

|-

|-

1934 births
Living people
Japanese Buddhists
Japanese anti–death penalty activists
Ministers of Justice of Japan
People from Okazaki, Aichi
University of Tokyo alumni
21st-century Japanese politicians